The 2010–11 season was Eintracht Frankfurt's 111th season and their 6th consecutive season in the German Bundesliga.

Info 

 Manager: Christoph Daum
 League: Bundesliga
 Shirt supplier: Jako
 Shirt sponsor: Fraport
 Average league attendance: 47,353 
 League: 17th
 German Cup: Round 3
 League top goal scorer: Theofanis Gekas  (16 goals)

Transfers

Results 
Pre-season matches

Domestic Cup

Friendly match

League matches

Friendly match

League matches

Friendly match

League matches

Friendly match

League matches

Domestic Cup

League matches

Domestic Cup

Indoor soccer tournament

Antalya Cup

League matches

Source: Notes: * Fixture date not yet fixed

Sources

 Official English Eintracht website 
 Eintracht-Archiv.de
 Eintracht Frankfurt on the kicker sports magazine

2010-11
German football clubs 2010–11 season